The School of Paris refers to the French and émigré artists who worked in Paris in the first half of the 20th century.

The School of Paris was not a single art movement or institution, but refers to the importance of Paris as a center of Western art in the early decades of the 20th century. Between 1900 and 1940 the city drew artists from all over the world and became a centre for artistic activity. School of Paris was used to describe this loose community, particularly of non-French artists, centered in the cafes, salons and shared workspaces and galleries of Montparnasse.

Before World War I the name was also applied to artists involved in the many collaborations and overlapping new art movements, between post-Impressionists and pointillism and Orphism, Fauvism and Cubism. In that period the artistic ferment took place in Montmartre and the well-established art scene there. But Picasso moved away, the war scattered almost everyone, by the 1920s Montparnasse had become a center of the avant-garde. After World War II the name was applied to another different group of abstract artists.

Early artists

Before World War I, a group of expatriates in Paris created art in the styles of Post-Impressionism, Cubism and Fauvism. The group included artists like Pablo Picasso, Marc Chagall, Amedeo Modigliani and Piet Mondrian. Associated French artists included Pierre Bonnard, Henri Matisse, Jean Metzinger and Albert Gleizes. Picasso and Matisse have been described as the twin leaders (chefs d’école) of the school before the war.

La Ruche 
Many École de Paris artists lived in the iconic La Ruche, a complex of studio apartments and other facilities in Montparnasse on the Left Bank, at 2 Passage Dantzig, built by a successful sculptor, Alfred Boucher, who wanted to develop a creative hub where struggling artists could live, work and interact. Built from materials dismantled from the Medoc Wine Pavilion from the 1900 Paris World's Fair, it comprised 50 modest studios with large windows that let in a lot of light, with nearby buildings providing 50 more studios for the overflow of artists. Boucher called the complex La Ruche – French for Beehive – because he wanted the artists to work like bees in a beehive; he dedicated a large room in the complex where the poorer artists could draw a model that he paid for, and included a small theater space for plays and concerts. La Ruche opened in 1902, with the blessing of the French government. It was often the first destination of émigré artists who arrived in Paris eager to join the art scene and find affordable housing. Living and working in close quarters, many artists forged lasting friendships, e.g., Chaïm Soutine with Modigliani, Chagall and poet Blais Cendrars, and influenced each other's works. Artists who lived and worked in La Ruche include Amedeo Modigliani, Rivera, Tsuguharu Foujita, Jacob, Soutine, Michel Kikoine, Moïse Kisling, Pinchus Krémègne, Ossip Zadkine, Pascin, Marc Chagall, Amshey Nurenberg, Lipchitz, and more.

After World War I

The term soon gained currency, often as a derogatory label by critics who saw the foreign artists—many of whom were Jewish—as a threat to the purity of French art. Art critic Louis Vauxcelles, noted for coining the terms "Fauvism" and "Cubism" (also meant disparagingly), called immigrant artists unwashed "Slavs disguised as representatives of French art". Waldemar George, himself a French Jew, in 1931 lamented that the School of Paris name "allows any artist to pretend he is French...it refers to French tradition but instead annihilates it."

School of Paris artists were progressively marginalized. Beginning in 1935 art publications no longer wrote about Chagall, just magazines for Jewish audiences, and by June 1940 when the Vichy government took power, School of Paris artists could no longer exhibit in Paris at all.

The artists working in Paris between World War I and World War II experimented with various styles including Cubism, Orphism, Surrealism and Dada. Foreign and French artists working in Paris included Jean Arp, Joan Miró, Constantin Brâncuși, Raoul Dufy, Tsuguharu Foujita, artists from Belarus like Michel Kikoine, Pinchus Kremegne, the Lithuanian Jacques Lipchitz, the Polish artists Marek Szwarc and Morice Lipsi and others such as Russian-born prince Alexis Arapoff.

A significant subset, the Jewish artists, came to be known as the Jewish School of Paris or the School of Montparnasse. The "core members were almost all Jews, and the resentment expressed toward them by French critics in the 1930s was unquestionably fueled by anti-Semitism." One account points to the 1924 Salon des Indépendants, which decided to separate the works of French-born artists from those by immigrants; in response critic  referred to them as the School of Paris. Jewish members of the group included Emmanuel Mané-Katz, Abraham Mintchine, Chaïm Soutine, Adolphe Féder, Marc Chagall, Yitzhak Frenkel Frenel, Moïse Kisling, Maxa Nordau and Shimshon Holzman.

The artists of the Jewish School of Paris were stylistically diverse. Some, like Louis Marcoussis, worked in a cubist style, but most tended toward expression of mood rather than an emphasis on formal structure. Their paintings often feature thickly brushed or troweled impasto. The Musée d'Art et d'Histoire du Judaïsme has works from School of Paris artists including Pascin, Kikoine, Soutine, Mintchine, Orloff and Lipschitz.

After World War II
In the aftermath of the war, "nationalistic and anti-Semitic attitudes were discredited, and the term took on a more general use denoting both foreign and French artists in Paris". But although the "Jewish problem" trope continued to surface in public discourse, art critics ceased making ethnic distinctions in using the term. While in the early 20th century French art critics contrasted The School of Paris and the École de France, after World War II the question was School of Paris vs School of New York.

Post-World War II (Après-guerre), the term "New School of Paris" often referred to tachisme, and lyrical abstraction, a European parallel to American Abstract Expressionism. These artists include again foreign ones and are also related to CoBrA. Important proponents were Jean Dubuffet, Jean Fautrier, Pierre Soulages, Nicolas de Staël, Hans Hartung, Wols, Serge Poliakoff, Bram van Velde, Simon Hantaï, Gérard Schneider, Maria Helena Vieira da Silva, Zao Wou-Ki, Chu Teh-Chun, Georges Mathieu, André Masson, Jean Degottex, Pierre Tal-Coat, Jean Messagier, Alfred Manessier, Jean Le Moal, Olivier Debré, Zoran Mušič, Jean-Michel Coulon and Fahrelnissa Zeid, among others. Many of their exhibitions took place at the Galerie de France in Paris, and then at the Salon de Mai where a group of them exhibited until the 1970s.

Selected artists
Constantin Brâncuși, Romanian-born sculptor, considered a pioneer of modernism, arrived in Paris in 1904
Bernard Cathelin
Marc Chagall lived in Paris from 1910 to 1914 then again after his exile from the Soviet Union in 1923; Jewish; was arrested in Marseilles by the Vichy government but escaped to the US with help from Alfred H. Barr, Jr., director of the Museum of Modern Art, and collectors Louise and Walter Arensberg, among others
Giorgio de Chirico, an Italian who showed the first signs of magical realism later highlighted in Surrealist works, lived in Paris 1911-1915 and again in the 1920s
Jean-Michel Coulon, French painter, had the particularity of having kept his work almost secret over his lifetime
Robert Delaunay, French painter, co-founder of Orphism with his wife Sonia
Sonia Delaunay, wife of Robert, born Sarah Stern in the Ukraine
Isaac Dobrinsky
Jean Dubuffet
François Zdenek Eberl, a naturalised French painter, a Catholic born in Prague 
Tsuguharu Foujita, Japanese-French painter
 a Jewish painter from Poland 
Yitzhak Frenkel Frenel, father of modern Israeli art sent his students to learn in Paris. Carried the influence of the School Of Paris to Israel which up to that point was dominated by Orientalism.
Leopold Gottlieb, Polish paintier
, a Ukrainian-born painter associated with the Ballets Russes 
Max Jacob
Wassily Kandinsky, Russian abstract artist, arrived in 1933
Georges Kars, Czech painter
Moïse Kisling, lived at La Ruche
Pinchus Krémègne
Michel Kikoine, born in Belarus
Jacques Lipchitz, lived at La Ruche; Jewish cubist sculptor; took refuge from the Germans in the US
Morice Lipsi, Jewish sculptor of Polish origin 
Jacob Macznik (1905-1945), born in Poland, arrived in Paris in 1928, died at the hands of the Nazis 1945.  A young and highly regarded member of the École de Paris in the 1930s, prior to its decimation by the Reich.
Louis Marcoussis, had a studio in Montparnasse
Abraham Mintchine lived in Paris from 1926, then intermittently from 1930 after René Gimpel encouraged him to discover the south of France (he died tragically in 1931 at 33 years old).
Yervand Kochar
Amedeo Modigliani, arrived in Paris in 1906, lived at La Ruche
Piet Mondrian, a Dutch abstract artist, moved to Paris in 1920
Elie Nadelman, lived in Paris for ten years
Amshey Nurenberg, born in Elisavetgrad (Ukraine) in 1887, arrived in Paris in 1910, lived at La Ruche
Chana Orloff, Jewish, portrait sculptor worked in Montparnasse
Jules Pascin, Bulgarian-born Jew
Zinaida Serebriakova, Russian painter, arrived in Paris in 1905
Chaïm Soutine, born in a shtetl near Minsk, was unable to get a US visa when the German Army invaded, and lived in hiding under the occupation until he died in 1943 at age 50. Soutine, a friend of Modigliani, arrived in Paris in 1913 and lived at La Ruche
Avigdor Stematsky
 was born in Russia and arrived in Paris in 1920, where he was part of the Montparnasse émigré group. 
Maurice Utrillo
Aleksander Vardi, Estonian painter, arrived in Paris in 1925
Kuno Veeber, Estonian artist, arrived in Paris in 1924
Max Weber, German artist, arrived in Paris in 1905
Ossip Zadkine, born in Belarus and lived at La Ruche
, born in Belarus, friend of Soutine
 born in 1889 in Russia, died in France in 1977. Arrived in Paris in 1908. Volunteered for the French Foreign Legion in World War I, became a naturalised French citizen in 1938 
 Fahrelnissa Zeid

Associated with artists
Albert C. Barnes, whose buying trip to Paris gave many School of Paris artists their first break
Waldemar George, unfriendly art critic
Paul Guillaume, art dealer introduced to de Chirico by Apollinaire
Jonas Netter, an art collector
Madeline and Marcellin Castaing, collectors
André Warnod, a friendly art critic
Léopold Zborowski, art dealer, represented Modigliani and Soutine

Musicians
In the same period, the School of Paris name was also extended to an informal association of classical composers, émigrés from Central and Eastern Europe to who met at the Café Du Dôme in Montparnasse. They included Alexandre Tansman, Alexander Tcherepnin, Bohuslav Martinů and Tibor Harsányi. Unlike Les Six, another group of Montparnasse musicians at this time, the musical school of Paris was a loosely-knit group that did not adhere to any particular stylistic orientation.

Gallery

See also 

 Cité Falguière

References

Further reading 
 
 
 
 Painters in Paris: 1895-1950, Metropolitan Museum of Art, New York, 2000
 Paris in New York: French Jewish Artists in Private Collections, Jewish Museum, New York, 2000
 Windows on the City: The School of Paris, 1900–1945, Guggenheim Museum, Bilbao, 2016
 The Circle of Montparnasse, Jewish Artists in Paris 1905-1945, From Eastern Europe to Paris and Beyond, exhibition catalogue Jewish Museum New York, 1985
 Enriched by Otherness : Impact of the Ecole de Paris, written in French by Juliette Gaufreteau, Sorbonne University, translation by Lily Pouydebasque, University College of London. Article available on L'AiR Arts Association website.

External links 

  Nadine Nieszawer's website, dedicated to the School of Paris 1905-1939 (includes many biographies)
 The Second Spanish School of Paris
 Website for Jewish art of the School of Paris circle
 school-of-paris.org : community website open to any fan to École de Paris in the world
 The School of Paris 1945 – 1965
Guggenheim holdings by School of Paris artists

 
Art Informel and Tachisme
Modern art
History of Paris
French art movements